Viktorija Panchurova (born 25 December 1999) is a Macedonian footballer who plays as a goalkeeper for 1. liga club ŽFK Tiverija Istatov and the North Macedonia women's national team.

References

1999 births
Living people
Women's association football goalkeepers
Macedonian women's footballers
North Macedonia women's international footballers
KF Vllaznia Shkodër players
Macedonian expatriate footballers
Macedonian expatriate sportspeople in Albania
Expatriate footballers in Albania